Colonel Humphrey Flack is an American sitcom which ran Wednesdays at 9 p.m. ET from October 7, 1953, to July 2, 1954, on the DuMont Television Network, then revived from 1958 to 1959 for first-run syndication.

The series also aired under the titles The Fabulous Fraud, The Adventures of Colonel Flack, and The Imposter.

Overview
The series is about a con man who defrauded rich people, then gave some of the money to the needy. Colonel Humphrey Flack starred British actor Alan Mowbray as the Colonel, and Frank Jenks as his sidekick, Uthas P. ("Patsy") Garvey. The TV series was based on a popular series of short stories by Everett Rhodes Castle published in The Saturday Evening Post.

The pilot for the series aired on May 31, 1953, on an episode of the ABC Album/Plymouth Playhouse.

When the series was revived in 1958, it was retitled Colonel Flack. The 39 episodes (all remakes of the original 39 episodes) aired from October 5, 1958, to July 5, 1959, in syndication. The syndicated programs were made by Desilu Productions and featured Mowbray and Jenks in their original roles.

Reception
A review in TV Guide noted that the program succeeded as a situation comedy "without benefit of any husband-and-wife team, precocious children, etc." It also complimented Mowbray's and Jenks's portrayals of their characters.

Episode status
At least 12 episodes of the DuMont series are in the collection of the UCLA Film and Television Archive and two episodes are at the Paley Center for Media.

See also
 1953-54 United States network television schedule
 List of programs broadcast by the DuMont Television Network
 List of surviving DuMont Television Network broadcasts

References

General bibliography 
 Brooks, Tim, and Earle Marsh, The Complete Directory to Prime Time Network TV Shows, Third edition (New York: Ballantine Books, 1964) 
 McNeil, Alex. Total Television, Fourth edition (New York: Penguin Books, 1980) 
 Weinstein, David. The Forgotten Network: DuMont and the Birth of American Television (Philadelphia: Temple University Press, 2004)

External links
 
 List of episodes of original DuMont run
 List of episodes at CTVA
 Opening credits at YouTube
 DuMont historical website

DuMont Television Network original programming
1953 American television series debuts
1954 American television series endings
1958 American television series debuts
1959 American television series endings
1950s American sitcoms
Black-and-white American television shows
First-run syndicated television programs in the United States
American television series revived after cancellation
Television series by CBS Studios